The 1911 Wellington by-election was held on 21 July 1911. The vacancy came about when the sitting MP Sir Alexander Fuller-Acland-Hood  was elevated to the peerage. The by-election was won by the Conservative candidate Dennis Boles.

Vacancy
Sir Alexander Fuller-Acland-Hood had been Conservative MP for Wellington, Somerset since 1892.  The seat had been Conservative since it was gained from the Liberals in 1886. He was raised to the peerage as Baron St Audries, of St Audries in the County of Somerset and given a seat in the House of Lords.

Electoral history
Acland-Hood was returned at the last election unopposed. In the previous election the result was;

Candidates
Devonian Dennis Boles was chosen by the Conservatives to defend the seat, having never stood for parliament before. The Liberals chose C.H. Dudley Ward, who had stood here in 1906.

Result

Aftermath
A General Election was due to take place by the end of 1915. By the autumn of 1914, the following candidates had been adopted to contest that election. Due to the outbreak of war, the election never took place;
Unionist: Dennis Boles
Liberal:
Following boundary changes the seat was abolished and mostly replaced by Taunton

Boles was the endorsed candidate of the Coalition Government.

References

1911 in England
1911 elections in the United Kingdom
By-elections to the Parliament of the United Kingdom in Somerset constituencies
Taunton Deane
20th century in Somerset
July 1911 events